Joseph Michael Williams (born 8 December 1996) is an English professional footballer who plays for Bristol City, as a midfielder.

Williams began his career with Everton, spending loan spells at Barnsley and Bolton Wanderers, later playing for Wigan Athletic and Bristol City.

Club career
Williams was born in Liverpool, Merseyside. He joined local side Everton at the age of seven, progressing through the age groups to become a first year scholar in June 2013. In November 2014 he appeared as an unused substitute for the UEFA Europa League game against FC Krasnodar.

In July 2017 he joined Barnsley on loan. He scored his first goal for the club in a 4–2 win at Burton Albion on 31 October 2017.

On 23 August 2018 he joined Bolton Wanderers on a season long loan.

In July 2019 he signed for Wigan Athletic.

On 20 August 2020, Williams signed for Bristol City for £1,200,000 signing a four-year deal.

International career
He has represented England at under-20 youth level.

Career statistics

References

External links
Profile at the Everton F.C. website

1996 births
Living people
English footballers
England youth international footballers
Association football midfielders
Everton F.C. players
Barnsley F.C. players
Bolton Wanderers F.C. players
Wigan Athletic F.C. players
Bristol City F.C. players
English Football League players
Footballers from Liverpool